Rom, or ROM may refer to:

Biomechanics and medicine
 Risk of mortality, a medical classification to estimate the likelihood of death for a patient
 Rupture of membranes, a term used during pregnancy to describe a rupture of the amniotic sac
 Range of motion, e.g. of joints in physiotherapy

Computers and mathematics
 Android ROM, a file containing executable instructions of an Android OS 
 Read-only memory, a type of storage media that is used in computers and other electronic devices
 ROM cartridge, a portable form of read-only memory
 ROM image, a computer file which contains a copy of the data from a read-only memory chip
 ROM (MUD), a popular MUD codebase

Engineering
 Range of motion, the distance that a movable object may normally travel while properly attached to another object
 RFID on metal, radio-frequency identification (RFID) tags which perform a specific function when attached to metal objects
 Rough order of magnitude, a type of cost estimation

Fiction and entertainment
 Ethan Rom, one of the Others in the TV series Lost
 Rom (comics), a Marvel Comics superhero based on the Parker Brothers toy of the same name
 Rom (Star Trek), a Ferengi character in Star Trek: Deep Space Nine
 Rom, a fictional character in Hyperdimension Neptunia Mk2
 Runes of Magic, a popular MMORPG
 Rom, a boss in the videogame Bloodborne
 Read-Only Memory (publisher), a British publisher of art books related to the Britsoft era of video game development
 Rom (album)

Places and structures
 River Rom, England
 Rom (river), Switzerland and Italy
 Rom, Afghanistan, a village in Sar-e Pol province, Afghanistan
 Rom, Deux-Sèvres, a commune in the Deux-Sèvres department in western France
 Rom (Mecklenburg), a community in the district of Parchim, Mecklenburg-Vorpommern, Germany
 Rom, a district of Morsbach in North Rhine-Westphalia, Germany
 Rom, Iran, a village in South Khorasan Province, Iran
 Royal Ontario Museum, a museum in Toronto, Ontario, Canada
 The Rom, skatepark in Hornchurch, East London, England
 Romania, UNDP code and former IOC code

Society

 Rom (plural Roma), one of the ethnic designations used by the Romani people
 rom, Romani language, language code ISO 639 alpha-2 
 Rom or ROM, system of Indigenous Australian customary law
ROM ceremony, a Yolngu ceremonial practice

Other uses
 Return on margin, a judge of performance based on the net gain or net loss compared to the perceived risk
 Refuel On the Move, a DoD logistic action
Epistle to the Romans, a book of the Bible commonly abbreviated Rom.